"Illest Motherfucker Alive" (censored on the album as "Illest Motherf**ker Alive") is a song by American rappers Kanye West and Jay-Z. It is only available on their collaborative album Watch the Throne (2011) on the deluxe edition. The song features additional vocals by Kid Cudi, Bankulli, and Aude Cardona. It samples "Tristessa" by Orchestra Njervudarov for an interlude.

Composition
The song includes a sample of "Tristessa" by Orchestra Njervudarov for the interlude played before it, which is also used for the interludes played after fellow album tracks "No Church in the Wild", "New Day" and "Welcome to the Jungle". Producer Southside revealed in an interview that he's responsible for the drums, the snares, the hi-hat and the breakdowns, and also that mostly all the synths were added by West. Jay compares himself to The Beatles and Beyoncé to Yoko Ono.

Release and recording
"Illest Motherfucker Alive" is only available on Watch the Throne as a bonus track on the deluxe edition. The involvement of Southside was due to him being in the studio whilst Lex Luger was co-producing West's song "See Me Now" and being asked by West's manager for beats.

Critical reception
Brian Josephs of Complex viewed the track's presence on Watch the Throne as being "pretty much there for you to revere two impossibly rich black men". It was described by Simon Price of The Independent as "brilliantly absurd" and he pointed out West's lines: "Bulletproof condom when I'm in these hoes/Got staples on my dick. Why? Fuckin' centrefolds".

Commercial performance
In the month of the album's release, the song peaked at number 4 on the US Billboard Bubbling Under Hot 100 Singles chart and never managed to chart on it again.

Charts

References

2011 songs
Jay-Z songs
Kanye West songs
Song recordings produced by Kanye West
Song recordings produced by Mike Dean (record producer)
Song recordings produced by Southside (record producer)
Songs written by Jay-Z
Songs written by Kanye West
Songs written by Kid Cudi
Songs written by Mike Dean (record producer)
Songs written by Southside (record producer)